In software engineering, a monolithic application describes a single-tiered software application in which the user interface and data access code are combined into a single program from a single platform.

A monolithic application is self-contained and independent from other computing applications. The design philosophy is that the application is responsible not just for a particular task, but can perform every step needed to complete a particular function. Today, some personal finance applications are monolithic in the sense that they help the user carry out a complete task, end to end, and are private data silos rather than parts of a larger system of applications that work together. Some word processors are monolithic applications. These applications are sometimes associated with mainframe computers.

In software engineering, a monolithic application describes a software application that is designed as a single service. Multiple services can be desirable in certain scenarios as it can facilitate maintenance by allowing repair or replacement of parts of the application without requiring wholesale replacement.

Modularity is achieved to various extents by different modularization approaches. Code-based modularity allows developers to reuse and repair parts of the application, but development tools are required to perform these maintenance functions (e.g. the application may need to be recompiled). Object-based modularity provides the application as a collection of separate executable files that may be independently maintained and replaced without redeploying the entire application (e.g. Microsoft "dll" files; Sun/UNIX "shared object" files). Some object messaging capabilities allow object-based applications to be distributed across multiple computers (e.g. Microsoft COM+). Service-oriented architectures use specific communication standards/protocols to communicate between modules.

In its original use, the term "monolithic" described enormous mainframe applications with no usable modularity. This, in combination with the rapid increase in computational power and therefore rapid increase in the complexity of the problems which could be tackled by software, resulted in unmaintainable systems and the "software crisis".

See also
Architecture description language
Multitier architecture
Software architecture

References

Software architecture
History of software